Caergeiliog is a village in Anglesey, in north-west Wales. It is in the community of Llanfair-yn-Neubwll and has a population of 355. The name derives from Welsh, and is a combination of Caer, meaning 'castle' or 'fort', and ceiliog, meaning 'cockerel'. It is unclear where the second element came from.

References

Villages in Anglesey
Llanfair-yn-Neubwll